Henry Cuevas (born 12 October 1954) is a former Colombian cyclist. He competed in the team time trial at the 1972 Summer Olympics.

References

External links
 

1954 births
Living people
Colombian male cyclists
Olympic cyclists of Colombia
Cyclists at the 1972 Summer Olympics
Place of birth missing (living people)